Sergio Román Martín Galán (born 13 December 1996 in Galapagar) is a Spanish cyclist, who currently rides for UCI ProTeam .

Major results

Grand Tour general classification results timeline

References

External links

1996 births
Living people
Spanish male cyclists
Cyclists from the Community of Madrid